This is a list of Cynic philosophers, ordered (roughly) by date.  The criteria for inclusion in this list is fairly mild. See also :Category:Cynic philosophers.

See also
List of ancient Greek philosophers
List of ancient Platonists
List of Epicurean philosophers
List of Stoic philosophers

External links
 Lives & Writings on the Cynics, directory of literary references to Ancient Cynics

 
Cynic philosophers
Cynic philosophers